Changing Hearts is the second studio album by the band Polyrock, released in 1981.

Track listing 
All songs written by Bill and Tom Robertson, unless noted.
"Changing Hearts" - 2:55
"Love Song" - 4:46
"Quiet Spot" - 1:26
"Cries and Whispers - 3:31
"Mean Cow" - 2:29
"In Full Circle" - 3:43
"Like Papers on a Rack" - 3:29
"The New U.S." - 3:54
"Slow Dogs" - 3:46
"Hallways" - 2:24
"Rain" - 4:00 (John Lennon, Paul McCartney)

Credits
Produced by Philip Glass & Kurt Munkacsi.

References

1981 albums
Polyrock albums
RCA Records albums